The United Kingdom Vineyards Association (UKVA) is a trade association of English and Welsh vineyards that represents that vast majority of the UK's vineyards. It is a UK government recognised industry body. It formed in the late 1990s.

Structure
It has six regional associations. Each June it holds the English and Welsh Wine of the Year competition. It publishes The Grape Press every six months.

The regional associations are:
 The East Anglian Wine Growers Association
 Mercian Vineyards Association
 South East Vineyards Association
 South West Vineyards Association
 Thames and Chilterns Vineyards Association
 Wessex Vineyards Association

See also
 Wine and Spirit Trade Association
 Wine from the United Kingdom

References

External links
 Website
 Ian Berwick gets MBE in 2004

Food industry trade groups based in the United Kingdom
1990s establishments in the United Kingdom